Tetraopes quinquemaculatus is a species of beetle in the family Cerambycidae. It was described by Haldeman in 1847. It is known from North America.

References

Tetraopini
Beetles described in 1847